The 1988–89 Pilkington Cup was the 18th edition of England's premier rugby union club competition at the time. Bath won the competition defeating Leicester in the final. The event was sponsored by Pilkington and the final was held at Twickenham Stadium.

Draw and results

First round

Second round

Third round

Fourth round

Quarter-finals

Semi-finals

Final

References

1988–89 rugby union tournaments for clubs
1988–89 in English rugby union
1988